Eddie Epstein is one of the pioneers of the modern age of baseball analysis, or Sabermetrics.  He was Director of Research and Statistics for the Baltimore Orioles from 1988 to 1994 and Director of Baseball Operations for the San Diego Padres from 1995 to 1999.  He was President of his own baseball consulting company, EBC, Inc., from 2000 to 2011 and in that role consulted on baseball operations and player personnel matters for several major league teams, including the Cleveland Indians, Oakland A's, and Tampa Bay Rays. He wrote the 1995 STATS Minor League Scouting Notebook, co-authored Baseball Dynasties with Rob Neyer, and wrote Dominance - the subject of which was the greatest NFL teams since 1950. The Wall Street Journal review of Dominance claimed that the book was, "Without a doubt the best book on pro football analysis ever written."

References

Year of birth missing (living people)
Living people